Cyril C. Smith was a Welsh professional footballer who played as an inside left in the Football League for Charlton Athletic.

Personal life 
Smith served in the Royal Welch Fusiliers until 1913 and served as a private in the Middlesex Regiment's 1st Football Battalion during the early years of the First World War. He was gassed at Delville Wood during the Battle of the Somme and was evacuated to a hospital in Liverpool. Smith ended the war as a private in the Royal Army Medical Corps.

Career statistics

References

Welsh footballers
English Football League players
Association football inside forwards
Newtown A.F.C. players
Croydon Common F.C. players
Southern Football League players
Crystal Palace F.C. players
Charlton Athletic F.C. players
1893 births
Sportspeople from Powys
Date of death missing
Guildford City F.C. players
Nuneaton Borough F.C. players

Royal Welch Fusiliers soldiers
British Army personnel of World War I
Middlesex Regiment soldiers
Royal Army Medical Corps soldiers
Date of birth missing
Year of death unknown
Place of death missing